Votice is a town in Benešov District in the Central Bohemian Region of the Czech Republic. It has about 4,500 inhabitants.

Administrative parts
Villages of Amerika, Beztahov, Bučovice, Budenín, Buchov, Hory, Hostišov, Javor, Kaliště, Košovice, Lysá, Martinice, Mladoušov, Mysletice, Nazdice, Nezdice, Otradovice, Srbice, Střelítov, Větrov, Vranov and Zdeboř are administrative parts of Votice.

Etymology
The settlement was originally named Otice after the founder of a local castle, a lord named Ota. In the mid-16th century, the name was changed to Votice.

Geography
It is located in the Vlašim Uplands.

The territory is rich in small ponds. The Mastník Stream flows through the western part of the municipal territory and supplies Velký Mastník pond, the largest of the ponds.

History
The first written mention of Votice is from 1318, however the archaeological research showed that the town was probably established in the 12th century.

Demographics

Sights

The Monastery of Saint Francis of Assisi was founded in 1627 by the then-owner of Votice, Sezima of Vrtba. The Church of St. Francis of Assisi was built next to the monastery in 1629–1631. In the second half of the 18th century, the dilapidated monastery was reconstructed into its current appearance. Today it offers sightseeing tours. One wing of the building houses a museum with several expositions.

The Church of Saint Wenceslaus dates from the 14th century. It was rebuilt in 1731. The massive tower of the church is open to the public as a lookout tower.

The two castles are among the landmarks of the town. The Old Castle is a late Renaissance building that replaced the local fortress. It is abandoned, unused and gradually decaying. The New Castle was built in the 18th century. Today it is privately owned and inaccessible to the public.

Gallery

References

External links

Populated places in Benešov District
Cities and towns in the Czech Republic